Joseph Foster Cairns (27 June 1920 – 2 May 1981) was a unionist politician in Northern Ireland.

Cairns was the managing director of a furniture retailer, and chairman of a development company.  He was elected to the Belfast Corporation for the Ulster Unionist Party, and served as Lord Mayor of Belfast from 1969 to 1972.  At the 1969 Northern Ireland general election, he stood in Belfast Oldpark, but was not elected. Cairns died in May 1981 at the age of 60.

References

1920 births
1981 deaths
High Sheriffs of Belfast
Members of the Senate of Northern Ireland 1969–1973
Lord Mayors of Belfast
Ulster Unionist Party members of the Senate of Northern Ireland